Robert Litchfield Juniper, AM (7 January 192920 December 2012) was an Australian artist, art teacher, illustrator, painter, printmaker and sculptor.

Early life
Juniper was born in the wheat-belt town of Merredin, Western Australia. He studied commercial art and industrial design at Beckenham School of Art, England.  After returning to Western Australia he painted, taught and exhibited in Perth. He was particularly championed by Rose Skinner, a local exhibitor. He was a long-term resident of Darlington and at different stages in its history involved with the Darlington Arts Festival.

Teaching
Juniper taught art at Perth College and Hale School in the 1950s, and at Guildford Grammar School in the 1960s. In the 1960s his excursions into the Australian outback with Ian Parkes was the inspiration for the subject matter a large part of his abstract style of art.

He designed the coat of arms for the Commonwealth Law Courts in Perth, in 1992.  His works are held in numerous collections, including the Art Gallery of Western Australia, the Art Gallery of New South Wales, the National Gallery of Australia, the National Gallery of Victoria, the Queensland Art Gallery and Parliament House, Canberra

Exhibitions
Juniper was given many solo and group exhibitions throughout Australia and overseas, including a major retrospective in 1999 at the Art Gallery of Western Australia, Perth.

He was represented for many years by Gomboc Gallery. Right up until shortly before his death at the age of 83, he continued to paint regularly, with increasing 'hands-on' assistance from his wife and remained both a highly productive artist and an inspiration and mentor to many other Australian artists.

Late work
Juniper was commissioned to work on a feature window in the restored Bunbury Catholic Cathedral. This work was completed in 2011.

Death
In 2002, Juniper suffered a stroke that robbed him of the use of his left hand.  He became ill in October 2011 when fluid gathered on his lung. Juniper died at his Darlington home on 20 December 2012 at the age of 83.

Awards
1954, 57, 59, 60, 62 Perth Prize for Contemporary Art
1966 T. E. Wardle Invitation Prize
1975 Wynne Prize
1979 Wynne Prize
1984 Honorary Doctorate, University of Western Australia, Perth
1988 Kingfisher Prize, New South Wales
1998 State Living Treasures Award, Ministry for Culture and the Arts, Western Australia
2003 Centenary Medal of Federation for service to Australian landscape painting and contemporary art
2004 Awarded medal for services to art, The Painters and Sculptors Association of Australia
2011 Appointed Member of the Order of Australia for service to the visual arts, particularly as an Australian landscape painter and contemporary artist

Personal life
Juniper was married three times and had four children, all by his first wife, Robin-Ann (née Brennan): Sato (previously Linda); Ben (Benedict); Sam (previously Damian) and Bec (Rebecca). They all live and work as professionals in various fields in Western Australia. He had 11 grandchildren and step-grandchildren and three great-grandchildren. His second wife is Amanda (née Silburn) and his third wife is Patricia (née Lowe).

See also
List of public art in Brisbane

Printed works
 Todd, Trevor (1977) Mason Judy, illustrated by Robert Juniper. Sydney : Methuen of Australia 
 (1982) Asphodel  [illustrated by] Robert Juniper, [text by] Lilla Cole. Fremantle, W.A. : Fremantle Arts Centre Press  (pbk.)

References
 Gavin Fry (2009) Robert Juniper, Sydney: The Beagle Press (with an introduction by Lou Klepac) 
 Lynn, Elwyn,(1986) The art of Robert Juniper Seaforth, N.S.W: Craftsman House 
 McNamara, Phillip (2000) Robert Juniper : mining the load of Juniper's art. Review of retrospective mentioned above in 1999. in Art and Australia, June 2000, p. 532-533,
 O'Brien, Philippa (1992) Robert Juniper Roseville East, N.S.W : Craftsman House

External links
 The Doug Moran National Portrait Prize 1996 – Robert Juniper, available online, https://web.archive.org/web/20070129063426/http://www.moranhealthcare.com.au/art/1996/juniper.html, 6 July 2005
 http://www.artlink.com.au/articles.cfm?id=79 - review at time of retrospective

Further reading
 Farmer, Alison (1999).Artist of our land. Juniper talks about his painting and his forthcoming retrospective exhibition to be held at the Art Gallery of Western Australia. Sunday times (Perth, W.A.), 29 August 1999, Sunday section, p. 8-9
 Robert Juniper talks about his life Western Mail, 8-9 Feb. 1986, Magazine section, p. 12-15,
 Bevis, Stephen At 78, Juniper is million dollar man of WA art The West Australian, 11 July 2007, p. 12

Notes

Australian artists
1929 births
2012 deaths
People from Merredin, Western Australia
Staff of Hale School
Guildford Grammar School
Recipients of the Centenary Medal
Members of the Order of Australia
Wynne Prize winners
Darlington, Western Australia